The Last Ones Shall Be First is a 1957 West German crime film directed by Rolf Hansen and starring O.E. Hasse, Ulla Jacobsson and Maximilian Schell. It is based on the short play The First and the Last by John Galsworthy which had previously been adapted into a British film 21 Days. It was entered into the 7th Berlin International Film Festival. It was shot at the Spandau Studios in Berlin and on location in Hamburg. The film's sets were designed by the art directors Kurt Herlth and Robert Herlth.

Cast
 O. E. Hasse as Ludwig Darrandt
 Ulla Jacobsson as Wanda
 Maximilian Schell as Lorenz Darrandt
 Adelheid Seeck as Charlotte Darrandt
 Brigitte Grothum as Irene Darrandt
 Bruno Hübner as Bettler
 Peter Mosbacher as Zuhälter
 Hans Quest as Junger Anwalt

References

Bibliography
 Bock, Hans-Michael & Bergfelder, Tim. The Concise CineGraph. Encyclopedia of German Cinema. Berghahn Books, 2009.

External links

1957 films
1957 crime films
German crime films
West German films
1950s German-language films
Films directed by Rolf Hansen
Films shot at Spandau Studios
German black-and-white films
German films based on plays
Constantin Film films
1950s German films